Inflammatory bowel disease-22 is a protein that in humans is encoded by the IBD22 gene.

References 

Genes